Compositional objects are wholes instantiated by collections of parts. If an ontology wishes to permit the inclusion of compositional objects it must define which collections of objects are to be considered parts composing a whole. Mereology, the study of relationships between parts and their wholes, provides specifications on how parts must relate to one another in order to compose a whole.

Mereology of material objects 
Ontological disputes do not revolve around what particular matter is present; rather, the center of disputation is what objects can be said to be instantiated by a given collection of matter. The token objects posited by a given ontology may be classified as instances of one or more distinct object types. 

As the types of objects accepted proliferate, so do the possible tokens that a given collection of matter can be said to instantiate. This creates variations in size between ontologies, which serve as an arena for disputes among philosophers. The ontologies of present concern are those that include compositional objects among posited types. Compositional objects are objects made of a collection of one or more parts . These objects seem to be included in any intuitively constructed ontology as objects ordinarily encountered are doubtless composed of parts. 

For example, any ontology that affirms the existence of tables, rabbits, or rocks necessarily commits to the inclusion of some compositional objects. The specification of ‘some’ compositional objects foretells the point of attack suffered by these theories. Clarification demands that these theories provide a means to account for which compositional objects are included and which are excluded. One may include tables and, presumably, chairs, but what about the composition of the table and surrounding chairs? What characteristics of a collection of parts determine that they form a whole?

Mereological nihilism 
Mereological nihilism is an extreme eliminative position. Mereological nihilism denies that any objects actually instantiate the parthood relation appealed to in theoretical descriptions of mereology. If there are no relationships that count as parthood relationships, then there are no composite objects. One may initially seek to reject such a position by pointing to its counterintuitive conclusions. However, there are other mereological positions that prove equally counterintuitive and so a more substantial rebuttal is required. A principled rejection of mereological nihilism is put forward those committed to atomless gunk. 

A mereology is gunky if every part is itself a whole composed of further parts. There is no end to the decomposition of objects, no fundamental part or mereological atom. There is no place for the atoms posited by mereological nihilism in gunky ontologies. This causes a problem because if all that exists are atoms, but there is nothing like an atom that exists within an ontology, then nothing can be said to exist (Van Cleve, 2008). Noting the appeal of accepting that things do exist, one must reject mereological nihilism in order to maintain a gunky ontology. Not everyone will strive to maintain a gunky ontology and so mereological nihilism is still potentially a viable position.

Conservative theories 
There are various attempts to conserve the existence of parthood relationships. These theories all attempt to specify characteristics that a collection of objects must possess in order to compose a whole. Characteristics may derive from some principle or be proposed as brute fact.

Principled accounts 
A principled account of the composition relationship will appeal to a general characteristic which is sufficient to instantiate the relationship. Many of these accounts appeal to characteristics derived from intuitive notions about what does or does not allow objects to function as parts in a whole. Two such proposed restricting characteristics are connection and cohesion (Van Cleve, 2008). First, connection is the stipulation that objects must be spatially continuous to some degree in order to be considered parts composing a whole. Objects like tables are made of legs connected to tops. Tables and legs are in direct contact with one another, the parts are spatially contiguous. Yet, the chairs are only in proximity to the table and so do not compose a table set. In order to maintain the standard of absolute contiguity one would have to recruit the air molecules bridging span between the table and chairs. This is unsatisfactory though because it fails to exclude extraordinary objects such as the table, the air molecules, and the dog's nose as he begs for food. It seems that it is necessary to redefine connection as some degree of proximity between parts within a whole .

By abandoning the extreme of direct contact, any account of connection acquires the burden of defining what degree of proximity instantiates composition. It will not do to leave specification of degree for future theorists if one cannot even show it is possible to provide such a determination in a principled manner. The continuum of the spatial dimension is a three dimensional axes composed of distinct ordered points. Suppose absolute succession of points along a dimension corresponds to direct contact of parts. According to a moderate formulation of connection, composition is instantiated by two objects separated by a countable number of discrete points (x), where (x) need not be one, but cannot be unbounded. Unfortunately, even the more moderate formulation is untenable. Criticizing the possibility of bounding degree, Sider (2001) takes as given these premises:

(1) On a continuum of discrete points, if there are both instances of both composition and not, then the series of points instantiating composition (e.g. (1, 2, 3, 4)) is continuous with any series not (e.g. (5, 6, 7)).
(2) There is no principled way determine a cutoff for composition along such continuums (no non-arbitrary way to determine between (1, 2, 3) and (1, 2, 3, 4)).
(3) Since the nature of existence does not allow for indeterminacy a cutoff must be specified (a failure to determine between (1, 2, 3) and (1, 2, 3, 4) leaves (4) in a position between existence and non-existence that does not exist).

Conclusion: If composition is to be non-arbitrary then it must either always occur or never.
Sider's rejection of any bounding of degree is not particular to spatial proximity. Degree of cohesion can also be represented as a continuum. Much like absolute spatial contiguity was determined too strict, absolute cohesion is also rejected. To illustrate Van Cleve (2008) describes how a rod and line compose a fishing rod. The line must move with the rod to some degree. In order to accomplish this knots of line are tied around the rod. As the knots are tightened the line becomes more and more fixed to the rod. There is a cutoff where the line could be tighter, yet is tight enough to compose the fishing rod. Any variable represented on a continuum will fail to provide a principled determination of this cutoff.

Brute accounts

Van Inwagen's 'Life' 
According to Van Inwagen a collection of objects are considered parts composing a whole when that whole demonstrates life (Van Cleeve, 2008). This approach guarantees the existence of you and me, while ruling out extraordinary objects consistent with other conservative theories. Detractors of the 'life' criterion point out the difficulty of defining when life is present. It is not clear if a virion, a virus particle composed of nucleic acid and surrounding capsid, is a compositional object or not. Additionally, in some formerly paradigmatic cases of life it can be difficult to identify when it is no longer present, and thus the compositional object is no longer extant (e.g. brain death).

Mereological universalism 
Mereological universalism is an extreme permissive position. Essentially, mereological universalism contends that any collection of objects constitutes a whole. This secures the existence of any compositional objects intuitively thought to exist. However, by the same light that ordinary objects exist, so do much stranger ones. For example, there exists both the object composed of my key ring and keys and the object composed of the moon and six pennies located on James Van Cleve's desk (Van Cleve, 2008). Motivation for such a counterintuitive position is not immediately apparent, but arises from the ability to reject all alternatives. Despite little intuitive appeal, mereological universalism seems less susceptible to principled rejection than any of its alternatives.

References

Korman, Daniel Z., "Ordinary Objects", The Stanford Encyclopedia of Philosophy (Spring 2016 
Edition), Edward N. Zalta (ed.), URL = <https://plato.stanford.edu/archives/spr2016/entries/ordinary-objects/>.
Ney, A. (2014). Metaphysics: an introduction. New York, NY, Routledge.
Sider, T. (2001). Four-Dimensionalism. Oxford, Oxford University Press.
Sider, T. (2008). Temporal parts.
Van Cleve, J. (2008). The moon and sixpence: a defense of mereological universalism.
Varzi, Achille, "Mereology", The Stanford Encyclopedia of Philosophy (Winter 2016 Edition), 
Edward N. Zalta (ed.), forthcoming URL = <https://plato.stanford.edu/archives/win2016/entries/mereology/>.

Ontology